Butobarbital, also called butobarbitone or butethal, Soneryl, and Neonal, is a hypnotic drug which is a barbiturate derivative. It was developed by Poulenc Brothers (now part of Rhône Poulenc) in 1921.

References

Barbiturates
GABAA receptor positive allosteric modulators
Butyl compounds